Góra (meaning in Polish "hill" or "mountain") may also refer to many places:

The most notable is Góra, a town in Lower Silesian Voivodeship, south-west Poland.

In Greater Poland Voivodeship (west-central Poland):
Góra, Jarocin County
Góra, Międzychód County
Góra, Gmina Pobiedziska
Góra, Gmina Tarnowo Podgórne
Góra, Śrem County

In Kuyavian-Pomeranian Voivodeship (north-central Poland):
Góra, Inowrocław County
Góra, Mogilno County
A village now part of Żnin

In Łódź Voivodeship (central Poland):
Góra, Brzeziny County
Góra, Sieradz County

In Masovian Voivodeship (east-central Poland):
Góra, Legionowo County
Góra, Płock County

In Podlaskie Voivodeship (north-east Poland):
Góra, Mońki County
Góra, Suwałki County

In Pomeranian Voivodeship (north Poland):
Góra, Kościerzyna County
Góra, Wejherowo County

In Świętokrzyskie Voivodeship (south-central Poland):
Góra, Busko County
Góra, Staszów County

In Warmian-Masurian Voivodeship (north Poland):
Góra, Kętrzyn County
Góra, Pisz County

In other voivodeships:
Góra, Lublin Voivodeship (east Poland)
Góra, Opole Voivodeship (south-west Poland)
Góra, Silesian Voivodeship (south Poland)

See also 
 Gora (disambiguation)